Albin Felix Irzyk (January 2, 1917 – September 10, 2018) was an American brigadier general who was the oldest living veteran of the 3rd Cavalry Regiment. Joining the Army in 1940, he was the Commander of the 8th Tank Battalion of the 4th Armored Division of the United States Army during World War II, the Commander of the 14th Armored Cavalry Regiment during the Berlin Crisis of 1961, and Assistant Commander of the 4th Infantry Division in South Vietnam during his career.

Early life and education 
Irzyk was born on January 2, 1917, in Salem, Massachusetts. His parents had immigrated from Poland.

While at the University of Massachusetts Amherst, he received a bachelor's degree, and a commission from the Reserve Officers' Training Corps (ROTC) in the Horse Cavalry. Irzyk also has a master's degree in International Relations from the American University in Washington, D.C., and graduated from the National War College.

Military career 
In January 1968, Irzyk was commander of the Army's Headquarters Area Command in Saigon, in this role Irzyk organised the quick-reaction forces in the city that countered the Viet Cong Tet Offensive.

He retired from the army as the Commanding General of Fort Devens, Massachusetts in 1971.

Writing career 
Irzyk has written multiple books, including an autobiographical book He Rode Up Front for Patton and Patton's Juggernaut.

Legacy and honors
In 1999, a park on Fort Avenue in Salem, Massachusetts was dedicated to him. There is a military tank displayed there.

He turned 100 in January 2017 and died on September 10, 2018, at the age of 101.

Awards 
Distinguished Service Cross
Silver Star (2)
Bronze Star (4)
Purple Heart (2)
Legion of Merit - US Military 
Croix de guerre 1939–1945 (France)
Czechoslovak War Cross 1939–1945

References

External links
 Natuurpunt Schelde Leie
  Dragon Expo
 

1917 births
2018 deaths
American centenarians
Men centenarians
American University School of International Service alumni
American people of Polish descent
Military personnel from Massachusetts
Writers from Salem, Massachusetts
University of Massachusetts Amherst alumni
United States Army generals
Recipients of the Czechoslovak War Cross
National War College alumni
Recipients of the Silver Star
Recipients of the Distinguished Service Medal (US Army)
United States Army personnel of the Vietnam War
United States Army personnel of World War II
Recipients of the Legion of Merit
Burials at Arlington National Cemetery